Minarets High School is the first high school built in the Chawanakee Unified School District. The school's official first year of operation was in August 2008 with 27 9th graders in the Pilot Program.  The school moved onto the new campus in September 2009 with 135 9th and 10th graders.  In the fall of 2010, there were 290 9th, 10th and 11th graders. The school colors are purple and gold, and the mascot is a Mustang. Minarets is a 21st Century High School, a one-to-one laptop and project-based school. All students are issued MacBooks and may also bring a laptop of any type, if they wish.  Minarets has two primary Career Pathways - Ag and Natural Resources, as well as Arts, Media and Entertainment.

Minarets achieved WASC accreditation in July 2010. Minarets students scored very well on the 2009/10 California state testing.  Highlights included 75% of all 9th graders scoring Proficient or Advanced in English, while also getting an API of 772 (second highest in Madera County). On the CAHSEE in the spring of 2010, the 10th graders enjoyed a 90% pass rate on the California High School Exit Exam (CAHSEE).

Minarets Media students have had winning videos in the following contests: 2010 International Student Media Festival (2), 2010 California Media Festival (2), 2008 and 2009 Fresno ROP Skills Challenge (5 total), and many nominees in the Slick Rock Student film festival (Minarets has had freshman and sophomores competing against the best Juniors and Seniors in the Valley at Slick Rock). Minarets Media Students also produce a weekly TV show, a weekly school wide digital signage service and documents Minarets sports. Minarets Media students also do community service films for groups like: The Power of One, SkiJamin, The Kingsburg Historical Society among others. Advanced Media students recently produced the A/V segment for the Get Reel Film Festival, which featured a Wirecast-based, two camera live video and presentation that was an aggregate 18 gigabyte, 2 hour production.

Minarets High School also has a tremendous Ag and FFA Program with 400 current FFA members.  Students can participate in FFA through many of their science classes.  Minarets students have almost swept awards at our two county fairs, while also competing well at the state and national level in Parli Pro.

Minarets High School received a Golden Bell Award from the California School Board Association in the fall of 2011.  Their 21st Century High School Program was recognized for Invigorating High School. Additionally, Minarets has two Apple Distinguished Educators (Jon Corippo and Patrick Wilson), two Central Valley Computer Using Educators Teachers of the Year (Jon Corippo in 2009-2010 and Jamie Smith in 2011–2012), the CVCUE and CUE Site Administrator of the Year in 2010 (Michael Niehoff), etc.

References 

Educational institutions established in 2008
High schools in Madera County, California
Public high schools in California
2008 establishments in California